Mercedes Ferrer (Madrid, 1963) is a Spanish singer-songwriter, active since 1983.

She studied modern literature in the Sorbonne.

Influenced by The Doors, Bob Dylan and David Bowie, she played in several French bands until she went back to Madrid in 1984, during La Movida Madrileña. She met Carlos Torero and more musicians and they founded the group La llave, which won VIII trofeo rock Villa de Madrid in 1985 and was a support band of The Cure.

She later began a solo career during which she has met Yoko Ono and Nacho Cano, who composed the famous song "Vivimos siempre juntos" ("We Always Lived Together"), which was a No.1 hit in Spain in 1996. In the early 1990s she lived in New York and went back to Madrid in 1993. She has participated in several artistic events, like a tribute to John Lennon and a concert for the victims of 11 March 2004 Madrid train bombings.

Discography
Entre mi sombra y yo, 1986
Tengo todas las calles, 1988
Imán, 1991
Tiempo futuro, 1994
Generaciones, 1997
Tiempo real, 2003
Intermedio (1986-2006), 2006
Travesía, 2009

External links 
Website

1963 births
Living people
Musicians from Madrid
University of Paris alumni
Spanish women pop singers
Spanish expatriates in France